The African Youth Championship 1981 was contested through home and away matches. It also served as qualification for the 1981 FIFA World Youth Championship.

Teams
The following teams entered the tournament (and played at least one match):

Preliminary round
The first leg was played on 8 June 1980.  The second leg was held on 22 June 1980.  The winners advanced to the First Round. 

Guinea, Cameroon, Tunisia, Morocco, Ethiopia, Mauritania, Algeria, Nigeria, Ivory Coast, Egypt, Uganda, the Central African Republic and Kenya all received byes to the First Round.

|}

1 Malawi and Benin withdrew.

First round

|}

1 Côte d'Ivoire, Uganda and Kenya withdrew.

Second round

|}

1 The second leg was scratched and Algeria advanced to the semi-finals as Central African Republic were forced to withdraw after the first leg due to civil unrest and political turmoil in the country.

Semi-final

|}

1 Algeria withdrew.

Final
The first leg was played on 12 April 1981. The second leg was played on 26 April 1981.

|}

Qualification to World Youth Championship
The two best performing teams qualified for the 1981 FIFA World Youth Championship.

External links
Results by RSSSF

Africa U-20 Cup of Nations
 Youth Championship
1981 in youth association football